East Windsor is a town in Hartford County, Connecticut, United States. The population was 11,190 at the 2020 census. The town has five villages: Broad Brook, Melrose, Scantic, Warehouse Point and Windsorville.

History

In 1633, Settlers laid claim to the area now known as Windsor which included East Windsor. No English settlers lived on the east side of the river. The first English settler in what is today known as East Windsor, was William Pynchon, the founder of Springfield, Massachusetts. In 1636, he erected a warehouse for his settlement's transshipment of goods at what is now known as "Warehouse Point". Warehouse Point served as the southern border of Springfield, Massachusetts, for 132 years—until 1768—when Warehouse Point, Connecticut, was annexed by the Connecticut Colony. Pynchon selected the site of Warehouse Point because of its location near the Enfield Falls—the first major falls in the Connecticut River, the head of navigation where seagoing vessels were forced to terminate their voyages and transship to smaller shallops. By constructing a warehouse at Warehouse Point, Pynchon essentially forced all northern Connecticut River business to run through him and his settlement at Springfield.

Meanwhile, most of today's East Windsor was part of the prominent Windsor settlement on the east side of the river. Settlers avoided the East Side of the river due to the Podunk tribe who inhabited the area, particularly following King Philip's War in 1675. Simon Wolcott was the first settler in today's East Windsor. East Windsor also included today's Ellington and South Windsor. Eventually on May 10, 1768, The East Windsor parish was partitioned from Windsor. The center of town became what is now East Windsor Hill in today's South Windsor. The North Part of town center was Scantic.

In 1818, resident Solomon Ellsworth Jr, was blasting a hole for a well alongside his house in town. While in the process, he found some odd bones.  These bones would later be sent to Yale University and eventually be identified as Dinosaur fossils, specifically one of an Anchisaurus.  Though not the first fossils to be found, their discovery led to the dinosaur discovery craze later in the century as these were the first bones to be known as a dinosaur, four years before William Buckland determined it. The bones are still at Yale and the Ellsworth Homestead still stands on Rye Street near the South Windsor line.

In 1832, the Broad Brook Mill was created at the waterfall of the Mill Pond.

The town has five sections of town, Warehouse Point, Broad Brook, Scantic, Melrose, and Windsorville. The oldest section of town is Warehouse Point, which, as mentioned, was first used by William Pynchon in the 1630s, and later settled as part of Springfield in the 1680s.  The Scantic section of town was the center of town until the mills were built. The Windsorville section of town was once its own community, featuring a church, post office, mini-mart, and a park. Mulnite Farms is a tobacco farm on Graham Road, established in 1905. In 1897, the town's voluntary fire department was created in the mill. The Broad Brook Elementary school was established in 1951. In 1961 the town hall burned down. The new town hall is on Rye Street across from the elementary school. The new voluntary fire department building and senior center was built on the same site of the old town hall. On Memorial Day Weekend, in 1986, the Broad Brook Mill caught on fire during renovations, with the mill and the tire shop (on the site of the mill) burned down and the smoke being seen as far as Bradley International Airport and Hartford. A new mini strip mall was built on the site of the mill.

Geography

East Windsor is bordered by the town of Enfield to the north, South Windsor to the south, Ellington to the east, and Windsor Locks and Windsor to the west, across the Connecticut River.

By virtue of its location on the Connecticut River, Windsor functioned as a vital port.  Merchants on both sides of the river shipped timber products, brick, livestock, wheat, tobacco and other produce to supply plantations in the West Indies, importing sugar, molasses, salt, and British manufactured textiles, ceramics, hardware and glass on return trips. Windsor's Hooker and Chaffee mercantile firm maintained a store and packing houses right off Windsor's Palisado Green.  Small scale shipbuilding took place at the mouth of the Scantic River in what is now South Windsor, Warehouse Point in what is now East Windsor, and along the Farmington from as far upriver as today's village of Poquonock.

Demographics

As of the census of 2000, there were 9,818 people, 4,078 households, and 2,556 families residing in the town. The racial makeup of the town was 91.47% White, 4.09% African American, 0.16% Native American, 2.00% Asian, 0.04% Pacific Islander, 0.83% from other races, and 1.41% from two or more races. Hispanic or Latino of any race were 2.11% of the population.

There were 4,078 households, out of which 27.5% had children under the age of 18 living with them, 48.7% were married couples living together, 10.1% had a female householder with no husband present, and 37.3% were non-families. 30.0% of all households were made up of individuals, and 9.5% had someone living alone who was 65 years of age or older.  The average household size was 2.34 and the average family size was 2.94.

In the town, the population was spread out, with 22.2% under the age of 18, 6.2% from 18 to 24, 33.1% from 25 to 44, 23.8% from 45 to 64, and 14.7% who were 65 years of age or older.  The median age was 39 years. For every 100 females, there were 96.4 males.  For every 100 females age 18 and over, there were 92.6 males.

The median income for a household in the town was $51,092, and the median income for a family was $60,694. Males had a median income of $39,785 versus $33,446 for females. The per capita income for the town was $24,899.  About 3.5% of families and 4.1% of the population were below the poverty line, including 2.9% of those under age 18 and 4.6% of those age 65 or over.

Government and politics

Elections

Education

Elementary
East Windsor Elementary School System serves students in pre-kindergarten through grade 4. The Connecticut Children's Place runs from Grade 4 through Grade 12. Its principal is Joyce Welch. Homebound schooling runs from Pre-K through 12. The Broad Brook Elementary School principal is Laura Foxx.

Middle school
East Windsor Middle School serves students in grades 5 through 8. Its principal is Timothy Field.

High school
East Windsor High School serves students in grades 9 through 12. Its principal is Allison Anderson.

Transportation
U.S. Route 5 runs through the town from the border with South Windsor to Enfield.

Interstate 91 serves East Windsor with exits 44 and 45. Windsor Locks station is the nearest passenger train station.

Skylark Airport is a small airstrip to help young aviators learn how to fly.

Crime

East Windsor crime, according to city-data.com is relatively low against U.S. averages. Between 1999 and 2004, not including 2003, there was one murder, 26 rapes, 43 robberies, 41 assaults, 254 burglaries, 1248 thefts, and 177 car thefts.

Points of interest
The Connecticut Trolley Museum and the Connecticut Fire Museum are located in the Warehouse Point section of town.
The East Windsor Academy Museum operated by the historical society is located in the Scantic neighborhood.
The East Windsor Hill section of the nearby town of South Windsor was the boyhood home of the theologian Jonathan Edwards.
The Melrose School, now called the Melrose Library, is a one-room schoolhouse that was active until the early 20th century.  It is located in the Melrose section of town and is now used for local functions.
St. John's Episcopal Church (Warehouse Point, Connecticut) is on the National Register of Historic Places.

Notable people

 Lorrin Andrews, Congregational Church clergyman missionary to Hawaii, judge, and first Associate Justice of Hawaii State Supreme Court
 John Warner Barber, engraver whose books of state, national, and local history featured his vivid engravings
 Israel Bissell, post-rider who alerted the colonists of the British attack on April 19, 1775
 Daniel Bissell, Soldier and spy for the Continental Army during the American Revolutionary War
 Samuel Robbins Brown, missionary to China and Japan with the Dutch Reformed Church
 Eliphalet Chapin, cabinetmaker and furniture maker 
 Aaron Civale, pitcher for the Cleveland Guardians
 Jonathan Edwards, theologian
 Frederick Holbrook, Governor of Vermont
 Jerry Marquis, former NASCAR driver
 Walter Loomis Newberry, businessman and philanthropist
 Eli Terry, first inventor to receive a United States patent for a clock mechanism
 Lizabeth A. Turner (1829–1907), National President, Woman's Relief Corps
 Erastus Wolcott, 18th-century member of the Connecticut General Assembly representing East Windsor

References

External links

Town of East Windsor official website
East Windsor Chamber of Commerce

 
Towns in Hartford County, Connecticut
Connecticut populated places on the Connecticut River
Towns in Connecticut
Springfield metropolitan area, Massachusetts
Greater Hartford